Shantinagar is a neighborhood located in Dhaka, the capital of Bangladesh. It is under Paltan Thana. Shantinagar is administered by Dhaka South City Corporation. It is also one of the busiest areas in Dhaka. Its neighbouring areas are Bailey Road, Paltan, Rajarbagh and Kakrail. Numerous shops, pharmacies, restaurants and salons can be found in Shantinagar.

Education

 Green Bud School

References 

Neighbourhoods in Dhaka